Weber Yang (born September 11, 1980) is a Taiwanese actor. He is known for his roles in the television series Time Story (2008), Who's The One (2011), Two Fathers (2013), The Way We Were (2014) and A Touch of Green (2015). Upon completion of filming A Touch of Green, Yang took a year-long break from acting to spend more time with his parents and to take care of his older sister, who was diagnosed with cancer in that year. He returned to the screen in 2017, starring in the SET Metro drama series The Masked Lover.

Filmography

Television series

Music video

Published works

Awards and nominations

References

External links 
 

1980 births
Living people
Taiwanese male television actors
21st-century Taiwanese male actors
Male actors from New Taipei